Lepraria finkii is a type of lichen in the genus Lepraria. Its colours range from a greenish-gray to a bluish-green. The organism is generally found everywhere in the world, but more commonly found in tropical areas; it can be spotted in shaded areas on tree trunks, overtaking bryophytes, in soil banks, and in dry niches.

References 

Lecanorales
Lichen species
finkii